Pentti Kokkonen (born 15 December 1955 in Jämsä) is a Finnish former ski jumper who competed from 1977 to 1986. He won three medals in the team large hill at the FIS Nordic World Ski Championships with two golds (1984, 1985) and one bronze (1982). Kokkonen's best individual finish at the world championships was 5th in the large hill at Lahti in 1978.

At the Winter Olympics, his best finish was fifth in the individual normal hill at Lake Placid, New York in 1980.

Kokkonen had two individual victories in his career, both in the normal hill in Austria in 1979 as part of the Four Hills Tournament competition for which he emerged as the overall winner.

References

1955 births
Living people
People from Jämsä
Finnish male ski jumpers
Olympic ski jumpers of Finland
Ski jumpers at the 1980 Winter Olympics
Ski jumpers at the 1984 Winter Olympics
FIS Nordic World Ski Championships medalists in ski jumping
Sportspeople from Central Finland
20th-century Finnish people